This is a list of episodes of the thirteenth season of The Ellen DeGeneres Show, which aired from September 2015 to June 2016.

Episodes

References

External links
 

13
2015 American television seasons
2016 American television seasons